James Andrew McMillan (11 April 1869 – 20 February 1937) was a Scottish footballer who played in the Football League for Everton. He had earlier played for Vale of Leven, featuring on the losing side in the 1890 Scottish Cup Final, and later returned to Scottish football with St Bernard's,  his club at the time of making one appearance for the Scotland national team in 1897 against Wales after impressing in a trial. He later returned to live on Merseyside with his family.

References

1869 births
1937 deaths
Scottish footballers
People from Bonhill
Footballers from West Dunbartonshire
Scotland international footballers
English Football League players
Scottish Football League players
Association football forwards
Everton F.C. players
Vale of Leven F.C. players